George Hector Percival FRSE FRCPE (1902–1983) was a British dermatologist, academic author and president of the British Association of Dermatologists.

Life

He was born in Kirkcaldy in Fife the son of E J Percival.

Percival was educated at George Watson's College in Edinburgh. He then studied Medicine at the University of Edinburgh, graduating MB ChB

He joined the Edinburgh Royal Infirmary's skin department in 1923, rising to become Consultant-in-Charge (Physician) in 1936. From 1946 he was the Grant Professor of Dermatology at the University of Edinburgh.

He became an eminent dermatologist, a fellow of the Royal College of Physicians of Edinburgh, and president of the British Association of Dermatologists in 1961–62. In 1928 he was elected a Fellow of the Royal Society of Edinburgh. His proposers were George Barger, David Murray Lyon, Arthur Logan Turner and James Lorrain Smith. He resigned from the Society in 1933.

His research contributions included work on correlating skin diseases with calcium metabolism and parathyroid hormone, and vascular chemical mediators involved in cutaneous inflammation.

He died in Edinburgh on 3 April 1983.

Publications

 An Introduction to Dermatology (1967) included as an author from the 9th Edition
 Atlas of Histopathology of the Skin (1962)
 An Atlas of Regional Dermatology

Family

In 1937 he married Kathleen Dawson.

References

1902 births
1983 deaths
People from Kirkcaldy
British dermatologists
People educated at George Watson's College
Academics of the University of Edinburgh
Alumni of the University of Edinburgh
Fellows of the Royal College of Physicians of Edinburgh
Fellows of the Royal Society of Edinburgh
Presidents of the British Association of Dermatologists
20th-century non-fiction writers